This is a list of Cypriot football transfers for the 2019–20 winter transfer window by club. Only transfers of clubs in the Cypriot First Division and Cypriot Second Division are included.

Cypriot First Division

Note: Flags indicate national team as has been defined under FIFA eligibility rules. Players may hold more than one non-FIFA nationality.

AEK Larnaca

In:

Out:

AEL Limassol

In:

Out:

Anorthosis Famagusta

In:

Out:

APOEL

In:

Out:

Apollon Limassol

In:

Out:

Doxa Katokopias

In:

Out:

Enosis Neon Paralimni

In:

Out:

Ethnikos Achna

In:

Out:

Nea Salamis Famagusta

In:

Out:

Olympiakos Nicosia

In:

Out:

Omonia

In:

Out:

Pafos FC

In:

Out:

Cypriot Second Division

Group A

Alki Oroklini

In:

Out:

Aris Limassol

In:

Out:

ASIL

In:

Out:

Ayia Napa

In:

Out:

Karmiotissa

In:

Out:

Omonia Aradippou

In:

Out:

Omonia Psevda

In:

Out:

Ypsonas FC

In:

Out:

Group B

AEZ Zakakiou

In:

Out:

Akritas Chlorakas

In:

Out:

Anagennisi Deryneia

In:

Out:

Digenis Akritas Morphou

In:

Out:

Ermis Aradippou

In:

Out:

Onisilos Sotira 2014

In:

Out:

Othellos Athienou

In:

Out:

PO Xylotymbou

In:

Out:

References

Cypriot
Trans
Cypriot football transfers